"Endless Game" is the 41st single released by Japanese boy band Arashi. "Endless Game" was used as the theme song for the drama Kazoku Game starring Arashi member Sho Sakurai. It reached number one on the Oricon Singles Chart and was the 10th best-selling single in Japan in 2013, with 557,217 copies.

Single information
The single was released in two editions: a limited edition including a bonus DVD with a music video for "Endless Game", and a regular CD only edition including two bonus tracks and karaoke tracks for all the songs. The limited edition also contains a 16-page booklet.

Chart performance
"Endless Game" debuted at the top of the Oricon Singles Chart with opening sales of 478,000 copies, becoming the group's 30th consecutive number-one single in Japan. It was certified Double Platinum by the Recording Industry Association of Japan (RIAJ) for shipments of 500,000 units.

Track listing

See also
 List of Oricon number-one singles of 2013

References

External links
 Product information

Arashi songs
Oricon Weekly number-one singles
Billboard Japan Hot 100 number-one singles
Japanese television drama theme songs
2013 singles
J Storm singles
2013 songs